The Austin Ice Bats were a professional minor league ice hockey team based in Austin, Texas, from 1996 to 2008. The were originally members of the Western Professional Hockey League (WPHL) and later the Central Hockey League (CHL). The team was named for the Mexican free-tailed bats (Tadarida brasiliensis) that nest under the Ann W. Richards Congress Avenue Bridge in the city.

History 
The team was established in 1996 and played home games in Luedecke Arena at the Travis County Exposition Center, a multi-purpose building that was furnished with skating ice and dubbed the "Bat Cave" for the games. The team was originally a member of the Western Professional Hockey League (WPHL). The Ice Bats joined several other WPHL teams in a merger with the Central Hockey League (CHL) in 2001. The Ice Bats finished first in their division in both the 2001–02 and 2002–03 season, making it to the championship game and losing to the Memphis RiverKings both times.

On February 15, 2006, the Ice Bats left the Travis County Exposition Center and relocate to Chaparral Ice, near Austin's northeast border with neighboring Pflugerville. The Ice Bats cited scheduling conflicts at the Expo Center as the main reason for the move. Chaparral Ice proved to be an unsuccessful venue and seated only 500 fans. For the 2006–07 season, they were affiliated with the Minnesota Wild of the National Hockey League and the Houston Aeros of the American Hockey League. The team was coached by former National Hockey League player Brent Hughes from 1999 to 2003 and again from 2007 to 2008.

In May 2008, the team announced it was leaving Austin due to lack of fan support at Chaparral Ice center, which had a maximum seating capacity of 500. Anticipated competition with the announced Texas Stars of the AHL was also cited as a factor. The team attempted to relocate to Ford Arena in Beaumont, Texas, for the 2008–09 season, but was unsuccessful.

In 2021, a new junior team was launched using the Ice Bats' name in the North American 3 Hockey League.

Media 
Throughout the franchise's history, the Ice Bats had three play-by-play announcers: Mark "Space Wrangler" Martello, Glen "Sharky" Norman and Brian "Sun" Rea. Bob "The Blimp" Fonseca was the team's first PA announcer. Philip "Dollar" Billnitzer covered the Bats for the Austin-American Statesman during the inaugural season and continued to cover them for CitySearch.com for two more seasons.

References

External links 
Chaparral Ice official web site

Sports in Austin, Texas
Defunct Central Hockey League teams
Ice hockey clubs established in 1996
Ice hockey clubs disestablished in 2008
Ice hockey teams in Texas
Defunct ice hockey teams in Texas
1996 establishments in Texas
2008 disestablishments in Texas
Minnesota Wild minor league affiliates